The RS-15 is a Richard Schreder-designed metal Racing Class sailplane that was offered as a kit for homebuilding during the 1970s and 1980s.

Unlike Schreder's other designs, which are all designated HP (for High Performance), the RS-15 takes its nomenclature from the designer's initials and its wingspan in metres.

Design and development
The dominating aesthetic feature of the RS-15 is its pod-and-boom fuselage. The forward fuselage is a composite molding, and the aft portion is a 6" diameter aluminum tube. The V-tail is essentially the same as on other contemporary Schreder sailplanes, differing only in detail design from that of the HP-18.

Unlike Schreder's HP-series gliders, the RS-15 was intended to achieve more modest performance, sacrificing performance for a shortened build time.

Early RS-15 models featured wings that were essentially the same as the HP-16, and using the same one-piece machined aluminum I-beam wing spar. Later units were supplied with wing kits nearly identical to those of the HP-18, using that ship's riveted aluminum box spar. Unlike the HP-18, however, RS-15 examples usually lack the flap/aileron interconnect that adjusts the neutral aileron deflection to match that of the flap in the range of -10 to +10 flap deflection. Some of these sailplanes with the updated HP-18 wings have -10 to +90 degrees flap deflection.

Major features:
Pod-and-boom fuselage with relatively deep cockpit
V-tail that folds upwards for easy storage
Wing structure composed of spars with caps pre-machined from solid aluminium plate and aluminium wing skins bonded to closely spaced foam ribs
Fiberglass fuselage pod, wing tip skids and tail fairings
Tubular aluminum aft fuselage
Winglets added by some homebuilders
Water ballast carried inside the hollow aluminium wing spars
Typical Schreder trailing edge flaps/airbrakes

Specifications

See also

References

Schreder Designs webpage
Sailplane Directory

1970s United States sailplanes
Glider aircraft
Schreder aircraft
V-tail aircraft